The Gunfighter is a 1950 American Western film directed by Henry King and starring Gregory Peck, Helen Westcott, Millard Mitchell and Karl Malden. It was written by screenwriters William Bowers and William Sellers, with an uncredited rewrite by writer and producer Nunnally Johnson, from a story by Bowers and screenwriter and director Andre DeToth. The film was the second of King's six collaborations with Peck.

It was nominated for Best Motion Picture Story for William Bowers and André de Toth during the 23rd Academy Awards.

Plot
A young, reckless cowboy named Eddie deliberately provokes an argument with notorious gunfighter Jimmy Ringo, who is widely known as the fastest draw in the West, making him the perpetual target of every young gunslinger eager to become famous as "the man who shot Ringo". When Eddie draws his pistol, Ringo has no choice but to kill him. Eddie's three brothers seek revenge and pursue Ringo as he leaves town. Ringo ambushes and disarms them, then drives off their horses. He tells them to walk back to town; instead, they obtain fresh horses from a nearby stable and resume their pursuit.

As Ringo rides to the town of Cayenne and settles into a corner of the local saloon, the barkeeper alerts the local marshal, Mark Strett. Strett is a reformed gunslinger and old friend of Ringo's; he urges his friend to leave, since his presence will surely cause undue trouble. Ringo agrees to go as soon as he sees his wife, Peggy, whom he has not seen in eight years, and his son, who doesn't even know he exists. Strett tells him Peggy has changed her surname to conceal their relationship and doesn't wish to see him. Two locals - merchant Jerry Marlowe and local thug Hunt Bromley - both decide to kill Ringo; Marlowe blames him for his son's murder and Bromley wants to be famous.

Ringo spots Marlowe aiming a rifle at him and disarms the man before locking him up, though he swears he didn't kill his son. Molly — another old friend — eventually persuades Peggy to talk to Ringo. Ringo tells her that he is weary of life as a gunfighter and, having seen how Strett turned his life around, wants to settle down. He intends to head west to California, or down to South America, where people do not know him, and invites Peggy to come with him. She refuses but agrees to reconsider in a year's time if he stays out of trouble until then. Ringo meets his son at last, but honors Peggy's wish not to tell the boy that he is his father.

Ringo's business in Cayenne is finished, but he has lingered too long. The three vengeful brothers try to ambush him outside of the saloon before Strett and his deputies intercept and apprehend them. Ringo saddles his horse and bids farewell to Peggy and his son, but Bromley then fatally shoots him in the back. As Ringo lies dying, he claims to have shot first, and asks Strett not to arrest his killer nor hang him. Bromley, he says, will soon learn as Ringo did that notoriety as a gunfighter is a curse that will follow him wherever he goes, making him an outcast for the rest of his life.

Strett gives Bromley a severe beating and banishes him from Cayenne, musing that it probably won't be long before "the man who shot Ringo" meets his own grisly fate. In death, Ringo has finally found what he sought for so long: his wife's forgiveness and reconciliation. At his well-attended public funeral, Peggy proudly reveals to the townspeople for the first time that she is Mrs. Jimmy Ringo and sits next to Strett as her husband is buried. The film ends with a shot of a silhouetted, unrecognizable cowboy riding off into the sunset.

Cast
 Gregory Peck as Jimmy Ringo, the aging gunfighter known as the "fastest gun in the West"
 Helen Westcott as Peggy Walsh, a schoolteacher and Ringo's secret wife
 Millard Mitchell as Marshal Mark Strett, a former outlaw and old friend of Ringo's
 Jean Parker as Molly, a bar singer and former lover of Ringo's deceased comrade Buck Harris
 Karl Malden as Mac, the bartender at the Cayenne saloon
 Richard Jaeckel as Eddie, a cocky young man whom Ringo kills in self-defense
 Skip Homeier as Hunt Bromley, a dandy and aspiring gunfighter who hopes to kill Ringo 
 Anthony Ross as Deputy Charlie Norris, a lawman serving under Strett
 Verna Felton as Mrs. August Pennyfeather, a prominent member of Cayenne high society who abhors Ringo's presence
 Ellen Corby as Mrs. Devlin, one of Mrs. Pennyfeather's society friends
 B. G. Norman as Jimmy Walsh, Jimmy and Peggy's Son (uncredited)
 Cliff Clark as Jerry Marlowe, an old man who believes Ringo murdered his son (uncredited)
 Alan Hale Jr., David Clarke and John Pickard as Eddie's Brothers (uncredited)
 Kim Spalding as Clerk (his first role, uncredited)

Background
The film rights to The Gunfighter were originally purchased by Columbia Pictures, which offered the Jimmy Ringo role to John Wayne. Wayne turned it down, despite having expressed a strong desire to play the part, because of his longstanding hatred for Columbia's president, Harry Cohn. Columbia subsequently sold the rights to 20th Century Fox, where the role went to Peck. Wayne's final film, The Shootist (1976), is often compared to The Gunfighter and contains numerous plot similarities.

The script was loosely based on the purported exploits of an actual western gunfighter named Johnny Ringo, a distant cousin of the outlaw Younger family and enemy of Doc Holliday and the Earp brothers.  As in the movie, Ringo sought a reconciliation with his estranged family, in California, in 1882; but unlike the film his conciliatory gestures were summarily rejected. After a ten-day alcoholic binge, he died of a gunshot wound, probably self-inflicted.  Many of the circumstances and legends surrounding Johnny Ringo's life and adventures have been challenged in recent years.

The film was directed by Henry King, the second of his six collaborations with Peck. Others included the World War II film Twelve O'Clock High (1949), David and Bathsheba (1951), The Snows of Kilimanjaro (1952), The Bravados (1958) and Beloved Infidel (1959).

In the original ending, Hunt Bromley was arrested by the town marshal, but studio chief Darryl F. Zanuck was enraged at this resolution, so King and Johnson rewrote the final scene.

The western street set seen in the film was also used in The Ox-Bow Incident (1943), starring Henry Fonda.

The studio hated Peck's authentic period mustache. In fact, the head of production at Fox, Spyros P. Skouras, was out of town when production began. By the time he got back, so much of the film had been shot that it was too late to order Peck to shave it off and re-shoot. After the film did not do well at the box office, Skouras ran into Peck and he reportedly said, "That mustache cost us millions".

Reception
Aside from its Oscar nomination, the film was also nominated for a WGA Award for Best Written American Western. Writing for The New York Times, Bosley Crowther noted in his June 24, 1950, review:
"The addicts of Western fiction may find themselves rubbing their eyes and sitting up fast to take notice before five minutes have gone by in Twentieth Century Fox's The Gunfighter, which came to the Roxy yesterday. For suddenly they will discover that they are not keeping company with the usual sort of hero of the commonplace Western at all. Suddenly, indeed, they will discover that they are in the exciting presence of one of the most fascinating Western heroes as ever looked down a six-shooter's barrel."

Variety's website review says "There's never a sag or off moment in the footage...despite all the tight melodrama, the picture finds time for some leavening laughter. Gregory Peck perfectly portrays the title role, a man doomed to live out his span killing to keep from being killed. He gives it great sympathy and a type of rugged individualism that makes it real." Ronald Bergen says it "has gained in critical appreciation over the years and is now considered one of the all-time great westerns"

Stanley Kauffmann of The New Republic described The Gunfighter as an 'excellent western'.

Awards
The film was nominated for Best Motion Picture Story for writers William Bowers and André de Toth during the 23rd Academy Awards. The award went to the husband and wife team of Edna Anhalt and Edward Anhalt for Panic in the Streets.

Legacy
Another version of the story appeared in 1957 in the series The 20th Century Fox Hour entitled "The End of a Gun", with Richard Conte in the role of Jimmy Ringo.

Bob Dylan referenced scenes from The Gunfighter in his song "Brownsville Girl", co-written by playwright Sam Shepard. It appears on Dylan's 1986 release Knocked Out Loaded. Peck paid tribute to Dylan's words when Dylan received the Kennedy Center Honors in 1997.

See also
 List of American films of 1950

References

External links

 
 
 
 
The Gunfighter: You Can’t Go Home Again an essay by K. Austin Collins at the Criterion Collection

1950 films
Films directed by Henry King
Films scored by Alfred Newman
American Western (genre) films
1950 Western (genre) films
American black-and-white films
20th Century Fox films
Films set in the 19th century
American historical films
1950s historical films
Revisionist Western (genre) films
1950s English-language films
1950s American films